The Arkansas Highway 57 Bridge is a Warren pony truss bridge in Stephens, Arkansas.  It carries an old alignment of Arkansas Highway 57 over a branch of the Union Pacific Railroad near the city center.  The bridge is now closed to traffic; the road on which it is located is now called Ruby Street.  The bridge is distinctive in Arkansas for two reasons: first, it was the last bridge of its type on a state highway, and it has a pedestrian sidewalk on the outside of the trusses.  It is unknown who built the trusses; the bridge was built in 1928.

The bridge was listed on the National Register of Historic Places in 2005.

See also
List of bridges on the National Register of Historic Places in Arkansas
National Register of Historic Places listings in Ouachita County, Arkansas

References

Road bridges on the National Register of Historic Places in Arkansas
Bridges completed in 1928
1928 establishments in Arkansas
National Register of Historic Places in Ouachita County, Arkansas
Warren truss bridges in the United States
Transportation in Ouachita County, Arkansas